The green-throated sunbird (Chalcomitra rubescens) is a species of bird in the family Nectariniidae. It is found in Angola, Burundi, Cameroon, Central African Republic, Republic of the Congo, Democratic Republic of the Congo, Equatorial Guinea, Gabon, Kenya, Nigeria, Rwanda, South Sudan, Tanzania, Uganda, and Zambia.

References

green-throated sunbird
Birds of the Gulf of Guinea
Birds of Central Africa
green-throated sunbird
Taxa named by Louis Jean Pierre Vieillot
Taxonomy articles created by Polbot